Drăgușeni is a commune in Iași County, Western Moldavia, Romania, located on the Stavnic River at 30 km from Iași. It is composed of two villages, Drăgușeni and Frenciugi. The villages were part of Șcheia Commune until 2004, when they were split off.

References

Communes in Iași County
Localities in Western Moldavia